The 2016 Monster Energy FIM Speedway World Cup (SWC) was the sixteenth FIM Speedway World Cup, the annual international speedway world championship tournament. It took place between 23 July and 30 July 2016 and involved nine national teams. It was won by Poland, the first time they achieved success since 2013, and the seventh time in total. They beat hosts Great Britain by seven points, while defending champions Sweden finished third with Australia in fourth.

Qualification

 Terenzano - 2 June 2016

Qualified teams

Tournament

Final classification

See also
 2016 Speedway Grand Prix

References

 
2016 in speedway
2016